The League of Communists of Bosnia and Herzegovina was the Bosnian branch of the League of Communists of Yugoslavia.

Party leaders

Đuro Pucar (December 1943 – March 1965) (b. 1899 – d.1979)
Cvijetin Mijatović (March 1965 – 1969) (b. 1913 – d.1993)
Branko Mikulić (1969 – April 1978) (b. 1928 – d.1994)
Nikola Stojanović (April 1978 – May 1982) (b. 1933 - d.2020)
Hamdija Pozderac (23 May 1982 – 28 May 1984) (b. 1923 – d.1988)
Mato Andrić (28 May 1984 – June 1986) (b. 1928 - d.2015)
Milan Uzelac (June 1986 – May 1988) (b. 1932 – d.2005)
Abdulah Mutapčić (May 1988 – 29 June 1989) (b. 1932)
Nijaz Duraković (29 June 1989 – December 1990) (b. 1949 – d.2012)

See also
History of Bosnia and Herzegovina
League of Communists of Yugoslavia
League of Communists of Croatia
League of Communists of Macedonia
League of Communists of Montenegro
League of Communists of Serbia
League of Communists of Vojvodina
League of Communists of Kosovo
League of Communists of Slovenia
List of leaders of communist Yugoslavia
Socialist Federal Republic of Yugoslavia

References

League of Communists of Yugoslavia
Communist parties in Bosnia and Herzegovina
Parties of one-party systems
Political parties established in 1943
Political parties disestablished in 1990
Defunct political parties in Bosnia and Herzegovina
Political parties in Yugoslavia